The Southern Hemisphere is the half (hemisphere) of Earth that is south of the Equator. It contains all or parts of five continents (Antarctica, Australia, about 90% of South America, approx. one third of Africa, and some islands off the continental mainland of Asia) and four oceans (Indian Ocean, South Atlantic Ocean, South Pacific Ocean, and Southern Ocean), as well as New Zealand and most of the Pacific Islands in Oceania. Its surface is 80.9% water, compared with 60.7% water in the case of the Northern Hemisphere, and it contains 32.7% of Earth's land.

Owing to the tilt of Earth's rotation relative to the Sun and the ecliptic plane, summer is from December to February (inclusive)  and winter is from June to August (inclusive). September 22 or 23 is the vernal equinox and March 20 or 21 is the autumnal equinox. The South Pole is in the center of the southern hemispherical region.

Characteristics 
Southern Hemisphere climates tend to be slightly milder than those at similar latitudes in the Northern Hemisphere, except in the Antarctic which is colder than the Arctic. This is because the Southern Hemisphere has significantly more ocean and much less land; water heats up and cools down more slowly than land. The differences are also attributed to oceanic heat transfer  and differing extents of greenhouse trapping.

In the Southern Hemisphere, the Sun passes from east to west through the north, although north of the Tropic of Capricorn the mean Sun can be directly overhead or due north at midday. The Sun follows a right-to-left trajectory through the northern sky unlike the left-to-right motion of the Sun when seen from the Northern Hemisphere as it passes through the southern sky. Sun-cast shadows turn anticlockwise throughout the day and sundials have the hours increasing in the anticlockwise direction. During solar eclipses viewed from a point to the south of the Tropic of Capricorn, the Moon moves from left to right on the disc of the Sun (see, for example, photos with timings of the solar eclipse of November 13, 2012), while viewed from a point to the north of the Tropic of Cancer (i.e., in the Northern Hemisphere), the Moon moves from right to left during solar eclipses.

The Coriolis effect causes cyclones and tropical storms to spin clockwise in the Southern Hemisphere (as opposed to anticlockwise in the Northern Hemisphere).

The southern temperate zone, a subsection of the Southern Hemisphere, is nearly all oceanic.

The Sagittarius constellation that includes the galactic centre is a southern constellation as well as both Magellanic Clouds. This, combined with clearer skies, makes for excellent viewing of the night sky from the Southern Hemisphere with brighter and more numerous stars.

Forests in the Southern Hemisphere have special features which set them apart from those in the Northern Hemisphere. Both Chile and Australia share, for example, unique beech species or Nothofagus, and New Zealand has members of the closely related genera Lophozonia and Fuscospora. The eucalyptus is native to Australia but is now also planted in Southern Africa and Latin America for pulp production, and increasingly, biofuel uses.

One of the most notable animals to be found almost exclusively in the Southern Hemisphere is the penguin. A species is found around Isabela Island on the Galápagos archipelago in the Pacific Ocean, which straddles the equator. However, most of Isabela and the rest of the archipelago is located in the Southern Hemisphere, and it is deemed by the International Hydrographic Organization as being wholly within the South Pacific Ocean, rather than the North Pacific.

Demographics and human geography 

More than 850 million people live in the Southern Hemisphere, representing around 10–12% of the total global human population. Of those 850 million people, more than 215 million live in Brazil, the largest country by land area in the Southern Hemisphere, while more than 150 million live in Java, the most populous island in the world. The most populous country in the Southern Hemisphere is Indonesia, with 275 million people (roughly 30 million of whom live north of the Equator on the northern portions of the islands of Sumatra, Borneo, and Sulawesi, as well as the most of North Maluku, while the rest of the population lives in the Southern Hemisphere). Portuguese is the most spoken language in the Southern Hemisphere, with over 230 million speakers in six countries – mostly in Brazil, but also in Angola, Mozambique, Timor Leste, and small parts of Equatorial Guinea and São Tomé and Príncipe that lie south of the Equator.

The largest metropolitan areas in the Southern Hemisphere are Jakarta (34 million people), São Paulo (22 million), Kinshasa-Brazzaville (19 million), Buenos Aires (17 million), Rio de Janeiro, Surabaya (12 million each), Johannesburg, Lima (11 million each), Nairobi (10 million), Bandung (9 million), Luanda (8 million), Dar es Salaam, Santiago (7 million each), Belo Horizonte, Semarang (6 million each), Sydney and Melbourne (5 million each). Important financial and commercial centers in the Southern Hemisphere include São Paulo, where the B3 (stock exchange) is headquartered, along with Sydney, home to the Australian Securities Exchange, Jakarta, seat of the Indonesia Stock Exchange, Johannesburg, home to the Johannesburg Stock Exchange, and Buenos Aires, headquarters of the Buenos Aires Stock Exchange, the oldest stock market in the Southern Hemisphere.

Common tourist destinations in the Southern Hemisphere include Bali, Buenos Aires, Cape Town, Easter Island, Lima, Rio de Janeiro, Sydney and Tahiti. According to a 2017 report, the most popular Southern Hemisphere "bucket list" destinations among Australians were Antarctica, New Zealand, Galápagos Islands, South Africa and Peru.

Among the most developed nations in the Southern Hemisphere is Australia, with a nominal GDP per capita of US$67,464 and a Human Development Index (HDI) of 0.951, the fifth-highest in the world as of the 2022 report. New Zealand is also well developed, with a nominal GDP per capita of US$49,847 and an HDI of 0.937, putting it at number 13 in the world in 2022. The least developed nations in the Southern Hemisphere cluster in Africa and Oceania, with Mozambique and Burundi at the lowest ends of the HDI, at 0.446 (number 185 in the world) and 0.426 (number 187 in the world), respectively. The nominal GDPs per capita of these two countries do not go above US$550, a tiny fraction of the incomes enjoyed by Australians and New Zealanders.

The Southern Hemisphere has long been secondary in the global distribution of demographic, economic and political power, as it has less land than the Northern Hemisphere. In recent times however, countries such as Australia have made greater efforts to economically engage with those from their own hemisphere. Prior to the Age of Discovery, the Southern Hemisphere was largely cut off from cultural constructs of the Western and Eastern worlds. Some view both the West and the East as being Northern Hemisphere-centric concepts.

The most widespread religions in the modern Southern Hemisphere are Christianity in South America, Africa, Australia, Oceania, and East Timor, followed by Islam in East Africa and Indonesia, and Hinduism, which is mostly concentrated on/around the islands of Bali, Mauritius, and Fiji.

The oldest continuously inhabited city in the Southern Hemisphere is Bogor, in western Java, which was founded in 669 CE. Ancient texts from the Hindu kingdoms prevalent in the area definitively record 669 CE as the year when Bogor was founded. However, some evidence shows that Zanzibar, an ancient port with around 200,000 inhabitants off the coast of Tanzania, may be older than Bogor. A Greco-Roman text written between 1 and 100 CE, the Periplus of the Erythraean Sea, mentioned the island of Menuthias (Ancient Greek: Μενουθιάς) as a trading port on the east African coast, which is probably the small Tanzanian island of Unguja on which Zanzibar is located. The oldest monumental civilizations in the Southern Hemisphere are the Norte Chico civilization and Casma–Sechin culture from the northern coast of Peru. These civilizations built cities, pyramids, and plazas in the coastal river valleys of northern Peru with some ruins dated back to 3600 BCE. Easter Island, located about 3,500 kilometers from Chile and French Polynesia, is considered to be the most remote place on Earth to have been permanently inhabited by humans before the Age of Discovery. It was settled by a Polynesian group known as the Rapa Nui. Areas of the Southern Hemisphere that had no contact with humans prior to the Age of Discovery include Christmas Island and Mauritius (in the Indian Ocean), the Galápagos Islands, Juan Fernández Islands and Lord Howe Island (in the South Pacific), the Falkland Islands and Tristan da Cunha (in the South Atlantic) and the continent of Antarctica.

List of continents or submerged continents in the Southern Hemisphere

List of mainland countries or territories in the Southern Hemisphere

List of island countries or territories in the Southern Hemisphere

See also 
 Antarctica
 Australia (continent)
 Geographical zone
 Global North and Global South
 Land and water hemispheres
 Northern Hemisphere
 South Pole
 Zealandia

Notes

References

External links 
 Southern Hemisphere Countries 2021
 

 
Hemispheres of Earth